Pars may refer to:

 Fars Province of Iran, also known as Pars Province
 Pars (Sasanian province), a province roughly corresponding to the present-day Fars, 224–651
 Pars, for Persia or Iran, in the Persian language
 Pars News Agency, former name of Iranian news agency
 Pars-e Jonubi (disambiguation), villages in Iran
 FNSS Pars, a Turkish wheeled armoured vehicle
 Pars (surname)
 Pars interarticularis, in spinal anatomy
 The Pars, nickname for Dunfermline Athletic Football Club

PARS may refer to:

 Point-a-rally scoring in the game of squash
 Pakistan Amateur Radio Society
 Programmed Airline Reservations System
 Russian Mission Airport. Alaska, US, ICAO location indicator
 Pre-arrival Review System for import into Canada
 PARS 3 LR, a German anti-tank missile

See also
Parsa (disambiguation)
Fars (disambiguation)
Persia (disambiguation)